Oscar Emil Hagberg (December 18, 1908 – August 2, 1992) was an American football player and coach and United States Navy officer. He was the 25th head football coach at the United States Naval Academy in Annapolis, Maryland and he held that position for two seasons, from 1944 until 1945. His coaching record at Navy was 13–4–1.

Hagberg was born December 18, 1908 in Charleroi, Pennsylvania. He played college football as an end and fullback at Navy from 1928 to 1930.  Hagberg was the ends coach for the Midshipmen in 1933, 1934, and 1939.

In his naval career he saw service in submarines and commanded two boats during World War II, USS S-16 (SS-121) and USS Albacore (SS-218).

Head coaching record

References

External links
 

1908 births
1992 deaths
American football ends
American football fullbacks
Navy Midshipmen football coaches
Navy Midshipmen football players
United States Navy personnel of World War II
United States Navy officers
United States submarine commanders
People from Charleroi, Pennsylvania
Military personnel from Pennsylvania